The Ivy City-Fort Totten Line, designated Route E2, is a daily bus route operated by the Washington Metropolitan Area Transit Authority between Fort Totten station of the Red, Green, and Yellow Lines of the Washington Metro and Ivy City (Okie & 16th Streets NE). The line runs every 20-30 minutes during weekdays, 30 minutes on Saturdays, and 60 minutes on Sundays. Trips take roughly 20 minutes to complete.

Background
Route E2 operates daily between Fort Totten station and Ivy City connecting passengers along South Dakota Avenue NE and 18th Street NE. Route E2 operates out of Bladensburg division at all times.

E2 stops

History
Route E2, E3, E4, E5, and E8 all operated as part of the Military Road–Crosstown Line through the years starting from Friendship Heights station. Route E4 originally operated up to University City Apartments in Lewisdale, Maryland but was shorten to Riggs Park in the 1970s. Routes E2, E3, and E4 terminated at Friendship Heights while E5 and E8 were shorten to Friendship Heights in 1984. 

During the years, the E5 and E8 were discontinued and route E6 operated as part of the Chevy Chase Line. Prior to 2015, route E2 would operate between Friendship Heights station and Ivy City (Okie & 16th Streets NE), route E4 would operate between Friendship Heights and Riggs Park (Eastern Ave & Jamaica St NE) on weekdays only, and route E3 would operate on weekends only between Friendship Heights and Ivy City via Riggs Park as a combination to route E2 and E4. During the weekends as well, route E2 would operate between Friendship Heights and Fort Totten station only.

Beginning on September 24, 2006, route E3 midday service was eliminated and replaced by full route E2 and route E4. Route E4 and the full route E2 now operated during all days during the weekdays while the E3 only operated during the weekends. Route E2 kept its short trips between Friendship Heights and Fort Totten which only operated during times when the E3 operated.

In 2012, WMATA proposed to eliminate routes E3 and E4 and shorten route E2 between Friendship Heights station and Fort Totten station. Service between Fort Totten and Riggs Park/Ivy City would be replaced by an extended route D4 and F6 reroute. According to WMATA, this was to reduce running time and improve on-time performance, provide a level of service along the different portions of the line east and west of Fort Totten commensurate with the significantly different passenger demand on
the two portions, and allow for a more even frequency of service on the western portion of the line where the greatest demand occurs.

In 2014, WMATA proposed to split the E2 and E4 into two separate routes. Route E2 will operate its current routing between Fort Totten station and Ivy City having the Friendship Heights station and Fort Totten section replaced by route E4 short trips. This will improve reliability of service on route E2 and E4 by operating shorter routes and create a better balance of capacity and demand throughout the line. WMATA will also have timed transfers at Fort Totten to minimize wait time.

On June 21, 2015, route E2 and E4 were split into two different bus lines. Route E2 was renamed into the Ivy City–Fort Totten Line and has the same routing between Fort Totten station and Ivy City while route E4 remained as the Military Road–Crosstown Line replacing route E2 between Friendship Heights station and Fort Totten also adding weekend service. These changes also replaced route E3 entirely.

Route E2 will have frequencies between Ivy City and Fort Totten every 20-30 minutes during the weekdays, every 48 minutes on Saturdays, and every 60 minutes on Sundays.

During the COVID-19 pandemic, all route E2 service was reduced to operate on its Saturday schedule beginning on March 16, 2020. However beginning on March 18, 2020, route E2 was further reduced to operate on its Sunday schedule on March 18, 2020. All weekend service was also suspended on March 21, 2020. On June 28, 2020, route E2 service was reduced even further operating every 60 minutes only between 6:00 a.m. to 11:00 a.m. and 1:30 p.m. to 6:30 p.m. during the weekdays only. On August 23, 2020, additional service was added to the E2 but weekend service remained suspended.

On September 26, 2020, WMATA proposed to eliminate all route E2 weekend service and reduce the frequency during the weekdays due to low federal funding in response to the COVID-19 pandemic. However on March 14, 2021, route E2 weekend service was restored.

References

2015 establishments in Washington, D.C.
E2